The Standard (German: Die Standarte) is a 1934 novel by the Austrian writer Alexander Lernet-Holenia. Set during the closing days of the First World War an officer of the Austro-Hungarian Army attempts to save his regimental colours from capture. They are taken back to Vienna and ceremonially burnt.

Adaptations
In 1935 it was turned into a German film My Life for Maria Isabella directed by Erich Waschneck. In 1977 it was remade as The Standard a co-production directed by Ottokar Runze and starring Simon Ward.

References

Bibliography
 Goble, Alan. The Complete Index to Literary Sources in Film. Walter de Gruyter, 1999.
 Noack, Frank. Veit Harlan: The Life and Work of a Nazi Filmmaker. University Press of Kentucky, 2016.

1934 novels
Austrian novels adapted into films
Novels set during World War I
Novels set in Vienna
Novels set in Belgrade
Novels by Alexander Lernet-Holenia